is a passenger railway station located in the town of Kuroshio, Hata District, Kōchi Prefecture, Japan. It is operated by the Tosa Kuroshio Railway and has the station number "TK33".

Lines
Only local trains stop at the station.

Layout
The station, which is unmanned, consists of a single side platform serving a single line and is located on an embankment above farmland on both sides. There is no access road. A paved footpath from the mainroad ends in a flight of steps leading to the platform. There is a shelter on the platform for waiting passengers. The station is not wheelchair accessible.

Adjacent stations

|-
!colspan=5|Tosa Kuroshio Railway

History
The station opened on 1 October 1970 under the control of Japanese National Railways (JNR) with the name . On 15 November 1982, it was renamed Ariigawa Station. After the privatization of JNR, control of the station passed to Tosa Kuroshio Railway on 1 April 1988.

Passenger statistics
In fiscal 2011, the station was used by an average of 15 passengers daily.

Surrounding area
National Route 56 runs near the station and is reached by a paved footpath.
The houses around the station are marked on the map as Ariigawa. This is part of the town of Kuroshio.

See also
 List of Railway Stations in Japan

References

External links

Railway stations in Kōchi Prefecture
Railway stations in Japan opened in 1970
Kuroshio, Kōchi